Tudun Wada is a local government area in Kano State. The postal code is 710104.

A 2018 study of Tudun Wada found that both temperature and rainfall were likely to increase with climate change in the region, causing increased stress on crops, and would require increased climate change adaptation for agricultural practices.

A 2014 study found significant groundwater in the area. Flooding in September 2021 affected the community.

A public health study in 1998 found significant presence of Onchocerca volvulus in the local government area.

References 

Kano State
Local Government Areas in Kano State